Ipasha Peak is located in the Lewis Range, Glacier National Park in the U.S. state of Montana. Ahern Glacier is located on the southeastern slopes of the mountain while the Ipasha Glacier is to the southwest of the peak.

Climate
Based on the Köppen climate classification, it is located in an alpine subarctic climate zone with long, cold, snowy winters, and cool to warm summers. Temperatures can drop below −10 °F with wind chill factors below −30 °F.

Geology

Like other mountains in Glacier National Park, it is composed of sedimentary rock laid down during the Precambrian to Jurassic periods.

See also
 Mountains and mountain ranges of Glacier National Park (U.S.)

References

External links
 Weather forecast: Ipasha Peak

Ipasha Peak
Mountains of Glacier National Park (U.S.)
Lewis Range
Mountains of Montana